Franc Ymeralilaj (born 14 January 1995) is an Albanian professional footballer who play as a right-back for Greek Super League 2 club Chania.

References

1995 births
Living people
People from Mallakastër
People from Fier County
Albanian footballers
Association football defenders
Rodos F.C. players
KF Bylis Ballsh players
Kategoria Superiore players
Kategoria e Parë players
Albania youth international footballers